George Symons may refer to:

 George Symons (VC) (1826–1871), English recipient of the Victoria Cross
 George Symons (sailor) (1888–1950), British sailor on the RMS Titanic
 George James Symons (1838–1900), British meteorologist
 George Gardner Symons (1861–1930), American impressionist painter